Antonio Vera Moreno (born 11 October 1986 in Seville, Andalusia) is a Spanish retired footballer who played as a midfielder.

References

External links

1986 births
Living people
Footballers from Seville
Spanish footballers
Association football midfielders
Segunda División players
Segunda División B players
Tercera División players
Sevilla Atlético players
Mérida UD footballers
CD Linares players
CD Alcalá players
Lorca FC players